The Baker MB-1 was a 45 degree delta winged experimental aircraft designed to maximize use of its  engine and experiment with delta-winged design.

Design and development
The prototype was built around the remains of a wrecked Cessna 140 using its engine, propeller, and wheels. The landing gear was fashioned from truck springs. The controls were conventional with the elevator in the center of the delta's trailing edge and ailerons outboard operated by push-pull tubes. Plans for the aircraft were available for homebuilt construction.

Specifications

See also

References

Homebuilt aircraft
Delta Kitten
Single-engined tractor aircraft
Tailless delta-wing aircraft
1960s United States experimental aircraft